Maurice Thorez (28 April 1900 – 11 July 1964) was a French politician and longtime leader of the French Communist Party (PCF) from 1930 until his death. He also served as Deputy Prime Minister of France from 1946 to 1947.

Pre-War 
Thorez, born in Noyelles-Godault, Pas-de-Calais, became a coal miner at the age of 12. He joined the French Section of the Workers' International (SFIO) in 1919 and was imprisoned several times for his political activism.  After the 1920 split in the SFIO led to the formation of the French Communist Party (PCF) in December 1920, Thorez became party secretary in 1923 and, in 1930, general secretary of the party, a position he held until his death. After he took office as secretary general, he was supported by Soviet leader Joseph Stalin and the Communist Party of the Soviet Union.

In 1932 Thorez became the companion of Jeannette Vermeersch; they had three sons before marrying in 1947, and remained married until his death.

Thorez was elected to the  Chamber of Deputies in 1932 and reelected in 1936. In 1934, following a Comintern directive, he helped form the  Popular Front, an alliance between Communists, Socialists, and radical Socialists. The Front, because of strong popular support as France was reeling from the impact of the Great Depression, won the  1936 election. With the support of the Communists under Thorez, the socialist Léon Blum became Prime Minister of a Popular Front government and managed to enact much of the Front's social-legislation programme. Meanwhile, Thorez presided over massive growth of the Communist Party, beginning with the elections of 1936.

World War II 
Following the Molotov–Ribbentrop Pact of 1939 and the subsequent Soviet participation in the invasion of Poland, the Communist Party was against the French war effort and so was outlawed: the Communist Party did not support what the Nazis stood for but supported the Soviet Union's tactical treaty with Germany in order to direct German aggression away from the USSR and toward Great Britain. Its publications were banned and many party members were interned. Thorez himself had his passport revoked. Shortly thereafter, he was drafted.

Following the German invasion of the Soviet Union in June 1941, the French Communist Party openly declared it would violently resist the German occupation (though even before this the Communist Party organized a demonstration of thousands of students and workers against the occupation on 11 November 1940, and in May 1941 organized a strike of 100,000 miners in the Nord and Pas-de-Calais departments). During this time, articles written by and ghostwritten for Thorez appeared frequently in the party's underground newspaper, Humanité Clandestine. Each of these letters was signed 'Maurice Thorez, somewhere in France'. It was not until several years after the war that the party admitted that this was false, and that  Thorez had been in Moscow for the entire war. In his absence, the affairs of the PCF and of the Francs-Tireurs et Partisans, the party's resistance movement, in France were organised by his second in command, Jacques Duclos.

When General Charles de Gaulle's Free French Forces liberated France in 1944, Thorez received a pardon. After the Liberation, Thorez was ordered by Stalin to lead the PCF immediately after the Second World War to a non-revolutionary road to power. The instructions were to have the reluctant wartime Communist partisans surrender their weapons, and the party would became a powerful force in the post-war governments since it thought that it would soon win legally.

Post-war
In November 1944, Thorez returned to France from his exile in the Soviet Union, and in 1945 his citizenship was restored. The PCF emerged from the Second World War as the largest political party in France based on its role in the anti-Nazi resistance movement during the occupation of France, at least after 1941. Thorez was again elected to the Chamber of Deputies and reelected throughout the Fourth Republic (1946–1958).

In power 

Forming a popular front with the Socialist Party in the 1945 elections, Thorez became vice premier of France from 1946 to 1947. 

By 1947 a combination of the emerging Cold War between the United States and the Soviet Union and growing social conflicts in France, linked to the increasing gap between wages and prices, put the three party union (SFIO, PCF and MRP) under heavy pressure, culminating in the May 1947 crisis. Prime Minister Paul Ramadier received threats from the United States that the presence of Communist ministers in the government would have consequences, such as the blocking of U.S. aid from the coming Marshall Plan, or worse: "I told Ramadier," Jefferson Caffery, then U.S. ambassador to France, wrote in his diary, "no Communists in gov. or else."

Simultaneously, the 1947 strikes in France caused rumours to spread among the non-Communist members of the government that the PCF would attempt a coup d'état on 1 May: Jules Moch, SFIO Public Works Minister, claimed to have "certain information" on preparations of a coup by the PCF. Ramadier is alleged to have worked secretly with Georges Revers, the Army Chief of Staff, to set up a secret transport and communications network within the military to safeguard against such a coup, all without the knowledge of François Billoux, the Communist Minister of Defence. The crisis was also escalated by the beginnings of the colonial war in Vietnam, with the communist deputies in the National Assembly voting against the war. 

Combined, that led Ramadier to look for a pretext to dismiss Thorez and his colleagues from the ruling coalition. On 4 May, the PCF ministers voted against the government over deflationary policies such as wage and price controls, which was given as the reason for the PCF ministers being forced out of the ruling coalition on 7 May 1947. Thorez later recalled the May 1947 events:

In opposition 

In 1950, at the height of his popularity among party members, Thorez suffered a stroke and remained in the Soviet Union for medical care until 1953. That March, Stalin died and Thorez was a member of the French delegation to Stalin's funeral. During the absence of Thorez, the party was de facto controlled by Jacques Duclos. Thorez resumed his duties upon returning to France. Although his health had deteriorated, Thorez remained party leader until shortly before his death in 1964 on a Black Sea cruise.

He published in 1937 an autobiography, Fils du peuple (Son of the People, 1938). The book had been written with the help of :fr:Jean Fréville, who had inserted in the story a passage where the initials of the words formed the phrase "Fréville a écrit ce livre" ("Fréville wrote this book"). The passage, present on pages 36-37 of the first edition, was deleted in the following editions. 

In 1945, he published Une politique de grandeur française (1945; "Politics of French Greatness").

The city of Torez in Ukraine was named after him in 1964. In 2016, the city was given back the former name of Chystyakove by decision of the Ukrainian Parliament. The Moscow State Linguistic University was named the Maurice Thorez Moscow Institute of Foreign Languages (Russian: Московский институт иностранных языков имени Мориса Тореза) between 1964 and 1990.

References 

Works of Thorez

Further reading 
 Adereth, Maxwell. The French Communist party a critical history (1920-1984), from Comintern to the colours of France (Manchester UP, 1984)
 Bulaitis, John, Maurice Thorez: A Biography, (IB Tauris, 2018).  online
 Kemedjio, Cilas. "Aimé Césaire's Letter to Maurice Thorez: The Practice of Decolonization." Research in African Literatures 41.1 (2010): 87-108. online
 Maurice Thorez. Journal 1952-1964 (Paris: Fayard, 2020), in French
 Morgan, Kevin, Julie Gottlieb, and Richard Toye. "Harry Pollitt, Maurice Thorez and the writing of exemplary communist lives." in Making Reputations: power, persuasion and the individual in British politics (IB Tauris, 2005). online

 Robrieux, Philippe. Maurice Thorez. Vie secrète et vie publique (Paris, Éditions Fayard, 1975), 660 pp. in French.
 Rossi, A. A Communist Party in Action: An Account of the Organization and Operations in France (Yale UP, 1949)

External links
 

1900 births
1964 deaths
People from Pas-de-Calais
Politicians from Hauts-de-France
French Section of the Workers' International politicians
French Communist Party politicians
State ministers of France
Government ministers of France
Members of the 15th Chamber of Deputies of the French Third Republic
Members of the 16th Chamber of Deputies of the French Third Republic
Members of the Constituent Assembly of France (1945)
Members of the Constituent Assembly of France (1946)
Deputies of the 1st National Assembly of the French Fourth Republic
Deputies of the 2nd National Assembly of the French Fourth Republic
Deputies of the 3rd National Assembly of the French Fourth Republic
Deputies of the 1st National Assembly of the French Fifth Republic
Deputies of the 2nd National Assembly of the French Fifth Republic
Anti-revisionists
People granted political asylum in the Soviet Union
French expatriates in the Soviet Union
People sentenced to death in absentia
People who died at sea
Recipients of French presidential pardons
Burials at Père Lachaise Cemetery